Pere Miquel Carbonell (1434–1517) was a Catalan historian, humanist, notary, calligrapher, poet and writer.

Writers from Catalonia
Medieval Catalan-language writers
1434 births
1517 deaths
15th-century Catalan people
15th-century Latin writers
16th-century Latin-language writers